The Milwaukee Electric Tool Corporation is an American company that develops, manufactures, and markets power tools. It is a brand and subsidiary of Techtronic Industries. Since 2016 it has been the  largest supplier by volume of cordless power tools in North America.

History 

In 1918, the firm introduced a one-handed operation, 1/4" capacity drill that was significantly lighter than others then available.

A.H. Petersen and Albert F. Siebert founded the A. H. Petersen Company in 1922. The following year, the factory was destroyed by a fire and the assets of the closed business were sold. In 1924, Siebert formed the Milwaukee Electric Tool Corporation.

During the 1930s, Milwaukee began producing tools for the US Navy. The company developed sanders, polishers, electric hammers and hand grinders. In 1935, they introduced a handheld drill that could be used with a hammer action or without.

Milwaukee Electric Tool Corporation benefitted from the World War II manufacturing boom and its position as a supplier to the US Navy.

In 1949, Milwaukee added a spring clutch to hand held sanders, grinders and circular saws which reduced their recoil.

The Sawzall reciprocating saw was introduced in 1951. It was the first portable reciprocating hacksaw.

Ownership
 1924: The Milwaukee Electric Tool Corporation was established by A. F. Siebert in Milwaukee, Wisconsin.
 1975: Sold to Amstar.
 1986: Sold to Merrill Lynch.
 1995: Sold to Atlas Copco.
 2005: Techtronic Industries.

Awards

 Glassdoor's Employees' Choice Awards - #25 best place to work, 2022

References

External links
 

Power tool manufacturers
Tool manufacturing companies of the United States
Electrical equipment manufacturers
Manufacturing companies based in Wisconsin
Waukesha County, Wisconsin
American companies established in 1924
Manufacturing companies established in 1924
1924 establishments in Wisconsin
Companies based in Wisconsin
Automotive tool manufacturers
Goods manufactured in Mexico